is a limited express train service in Japan operated by the East Japan Railway Company (JR East), Central Japan Railway Company (JR Central), Izukyu Corporation, and Izuhakone Railway, which runs between  and  or  in Shizuoka Prefecture.

Summary
The Odoriko started service from October 1981, with the then-new 185 series rolling stock, replacing the earlier Amagi limited express (run by the 183 series) and the Izu express (run by the 153 series). After that, the Super View Odoriko also operated from April 1990 to 13 March 2020, with the 251 series rolling stock. On 14 March 2020, Saphir Odoriko started service using E261 series EMUs.

Regular services

Odoriko 
Vending services are available between Tokyo and Ito, but aren't available aboard temporary services. Aside from that, there are temporary services originating from Shinjuku or Ikebukuro. Also, with the Ueno-Tokyo Line opening in March 2015, there are temporary services originating at Abiko, via the Joban Line; and also at Omiya, via the Ueno-Tokyo Line.

Stations served 

 Tokyo ー Izukyu-Shimoda:
 Tokyo ー Shinagawa ー Kawasaki ー Yokohama ー Ofuna ー Odawara ー Yugawara ー Atami ー Ajiro ー Ito ー Izu-Kogen ー Izu-Atagawa ー Izu-Inatori ー Kawazu ー Izukyu-Shimoda
 Atami ー Shuzenji:
 (Coupled, and continue on towards Tokyo) ー Atami ー Mishima ー Mishima-Tamachi ー Daiba ー Izu-Nagaoka ー Ohito ー Shuzenji

Temporary services 

 Ikebukuro ー Yokohama:
 Ikebukuro ー Shinjuku ー Musashi-Kosugi ー Yokohama ー (Continue on towards Izukyu-Shimoda)
 Abiko ー Tokyo:
 Abiko ー Kashiwa ー Matsudo ー Kita-Senju ー Ueno ー Tokyo ー (Continue on towards Izukyu-Shimoda)
 Omiya ー Tokyo:
Omiya ー Urawa ー Akabane ー Ueno ー Tokyo ー (Continue on towards Izukyu-Shimoda)

Formation 

Services are now operated on E257 series EMUs.

On the now retired 185 series, the 15 car formation made the Odoriko the longest Limited Express train running in Japan (excluding shinkansen trains). They are formed as follows, with car 1 at the Izukyū-Shimoda/Shuzenji end.

Saphir Odoriko 

The Saphir Odoriko  commenced operations on 14 March 2020 to replace the Super View Odoriko as an ultra-deluxe version of the regular Odoriko. One Saphir Odoriko service runs to and from Tokyo station daily. During the peak travel season, an additional service runs from  during weekdays, and runs from  during weekends.

Stations served

Tokyo - Izukyu-Shimoda

 -  -  -  -  -  -  - -  - 

Shinjuku > Izukyu-Shimoda (seasonal service)

 -  -  -  -  -  -  -  -  -  - 

 Seasonal service from Shinjuku (Saphir Odoriko 5) does not have return service to Shinjuku, service will return towards Tokyo (Saphir Odoriko 4)

Formation

Trains are operated by E261 series trainsets. The trains feature all Green Cars, with Car 1 designated as a 'Premium Green Car' with 2 large reclining seats per row.

These services were consolidated with the regular Odoriko services.

Temporary services

Resort Odoriko 
The Resort Odoriko is a temporary service, which operates between Tokyo and Izukyū-Shimoda. The service normally consists of one outbound journey to Izukyu-Shimoda at special holidays only.

Stations served 

Tokyo ー Izukyu-Shimoda:
Tokyo ー Yokohama ー Ofuna ー Odawara ー Yugawara ー Atami ー Ajiro ー Ito ー Izu-Kogen ー Izu-Atagawa ー Izu-Inatori ー Kawazu ー Izukyu-Shimoda

Formation 
Resort Odoriko services operate using Izukyū 2100 series "Resort 21" 8-car EMUs, formed as shown below, where car 1 at the Izukyū-Shimoda end, and car 8 at the Tokyo end.

Former services

Super View Odoriko 
The Super View Odoriko was the first deluxe version of the Odoriko operated from 28 April 1990 to 13 March 2020. The service was originally scheduled to commence from the start of the revised timetable on 10 March 1990, but rolling stock delivery delays meant that services were substituted by regular Odoriko services using 185 series EMUs.

On weekdays, one train operated from Shinjuku to Izukyu-Shimoda, 2 trains operated back and forth between Tokyo and Izukyu-Shimoda, and one train operated from Izukyu-Shimoda to Ikebukuro each day.

On weekends, the Shinjuku-originating train changed originating station to Ikebukuro. Aside from that, services from Shinjuku to Izukyu-Shimoda and from Izukyu-Shimoda to Tokyo operated once a day. Moreover, during busy seasons, there were numerous extra services, with one extended service between Omiya and Izukyu-Shimoda, which ran along the Shonan-Shinjuku Line from Omiya to Yokohama; 2 trains from Tokyo to Izukyu-Shimoda, with only 1 returning to Tokyo; and one train from Izukyu-Shimoda to Shinjuku.

Stations served 
Stations in brackets meant that some services made stop there.

 Tokyo ー Izukyu-Shimoda:
  ー ー Yokohama ー (Odawara) ー (Yugawara) ー Atami ー (Ajiro) ー Ito ー Izu-Kogen ー Izu-Atagawa ー Izu-Inatori ー Kawazu ー Izukyu-Shimoda
 Only Super View Odoriko No. 5 and No. 8 stopped at Shinagawa.
 Only Super View Odoriko No. 2 and No. 11 stopped at Odawara, Yugawara and Ajiro.
 Ikebukuro ー Yokohama:
 Ikebukuro ー Shinjuku ー Musashi-Kosugi ー Yokohama ー (Continue on towards Izukyu-Shimoda)

Temporary services 

 Omiya ー Ikebukuro:
 Omiya ー Urawa ー Akabane ー Ikebukuro ー (Continue on towards Izukyu-Shimoda)

Formation
Super View Odoriko trains were operated with 251 series trains, with cars 1, 2 and 10 being double decker cars. Trains were formed as follows, with car 1 at the Izukyū-Shimoda end, and car 10 at the Tokyo and Shinjuku end.

Marine Express Odoriko
From 1 December 2012, seasonal Marine Express Odoriko services were introduced, running between Tokyo and Izukyū-Shimoda. The service normally consisted of one return journey at weekends only. JR East announced that from the start of the revised timetable on 14 March 2020, Marine Express Odoriko services would be discontinued as they were surplus to requirements.

Stations served 

Tokyo ー Izukyu-Shimoda:
Tokyo (Tokaido Line Platform) ー Yokohama ー Atami ー Ito ー Izu-Kogen ー Izu-Atagawa ー Izu-Inatori ー Kawazu ー Izukyu-Shimoda

Formation 
Marine Express Odoriko services operated using E259 series 6-car EMUs normally used on Narita Express services. The formation is shown below, where car 1 at the Izukyū-Shimoda end, and car 6 at the Tokyo end.

History 
The limited express service was inaugurated on 1 October 1981 following the introduction of the then-new 185 series EMUs, replacing the earlier Amagi limited express and Izu express services from Tokyo to Izu.
The Superview Odoriko operated from April 1990 until 13 March 2020. The Saphir Odoriko has been operating since 14 March 2020.

Future development 

Since the current rolling stock, the 185 series, is aging, there are plans to replace it.

The 185 series are beginning to be replaced by new E257-2000 series trains that used to operate Azusa and Kaiji limited express services on the Chuo Main Line, and were themselves replaced by E353 series trains. The 185 series trains were completely withdrawn from use on Odoriko services on 12 March 2021.

JR East has also announced changes to the reserved seating on Odoriko services coinciding with the full retirement of 185 series EMUs from the service. Trains will now use LED seat reservation status indicators, rather than having dedicated non-reserved seat cars. This is the same system used by limited express services on the Chūō Line and Jōban Line. There will be two types of such supplementary tickets in the new system, namely the Reserved Seat Ticket, and the Unreserved Seat Ticket. The Unreserved Seat Ticket will replace Non-reserved Seat tickets, which currently allow use of non-reserved cars.

The Reserved Seat Ticket enables a specified seat to be reserved for the holder. The reserved status for the seat is signified by a green overhead lamp on top of the corresponding seat.

The Unreserved Seat Ticket enables the holder to be seated on any unreserved seat. A red overhead lamp signifies that the seat is unreserved; while a yellow overhead lamp signifies that the seat is reserved for the later part of the journey, implying that one has to give up their seat to the passenger who has reserved the seat, when they board the train later.

Additionally, Tōkaidō Shinkansen passengers currently receive a discount if they transfer to an Odoriko service. This will be discontinued in March 2021.

Namesake 
The word odoriko means dancing girl in Japanese. The train service was named after the title of novel Izu no Odoriko (The Dancing Girl of Izu) by Yasunari Kawabata. The setting of the novel is the destination of the train, Izu Peninsula.

There are numerous services operating between Tokyo and the Izu Peninsula, which had all been discontinued and became the Odoriko limited express today.

 Amagi「あまぎ」, named after Mount Amagi, the mountain at the center of the Izu Peninsula.
 Ikoi「いこい」, derived from the Japanese verb "ikou" (憩う, いこう), which literally means to relax and rest (In this case, relax in the local onsens at Izu).
 Izu「伊豆」, named after the Izu Peninsula, and also the former Izu Province.
 Ideyu「いでゆ」, meaning hot springs, which are prominent at Izu.
 Okuizu「おくいず」, referring to the inner part (i.e. the southern part) of Izu.
 Olympia「オリンピア」, referring to the Olympic Games.
 Jukkoku「十国」, named after the Jukkoku Pass, a ridge between Atami and Kannami. The pass is called "Jukkoku" (literally: 10 provinces), because from there, 10 provinces can actually be viewed, namely Sagami, Musashi, Awa, Kazusa, Shimosa, Suruga, Totomi, Shinano, Kai and Izu Provinces.
 Shonan-Nikko「湘南日光」, as this former service links the Shonan region to Nikko.
 Joban-Izu「常磐伊豆」, as this former service links Izu to the Joban region, which refers to the combined region of the former Hitachi Province and the Iwaki Province, to Izu.
 Tachibana「たちばな」, Japanese for mandarin oranges, which is a major agricultural product at Izu. 
 Chiyoda「ちよだ」, named after the Chiyoda district, where the Imperial Palace is located.
 Hatsushima「はつしま」, named after Hatsushima, an island 10 km east of Atami.

See also
 List of named passenger trains of Japan

References

 JR Timetable, March 2008 issue

External links

 JR East 185 series Odoriko 
 JR East 251 series Super View Odoriko 

Named passenger trains of Japan
East Japan Railway Company
Tōkaidō Main Line
Izu Kyūkō Line
Railway services introduced in 1981
1981 establishments in Japan